This article details the 2009-10 Libyan Second Division season.

Format
This year, 47 teams will participate in the competition, split up into 5 groups depending on their geographical location. The top team in each group will progress to the Championship Play-off, where the five teams will play each other home and away to determine the automatic promotion place to the 2010-11 edition of the Libyan Premier League. The second-placed team in this promotion stage will face a two-legged playoff against the 11th placed Premier League team from this season to determine the 12th and final spot in next season's Premier League competition. The bottom team in each of the five groups will be relegated to the Libyan Third Division.

Promotion & Relegation
Teams relegated from 2008–09 Libyan Premier League
 Al Wahda, relegated after losing 4-1 to Al Ahly Benghazi on May 28, 2009
 Wefaq Sabratha, relegated after Aman al Aam's 2-1 victory over Al Ahly Tripoli on June 18, 2009
 Aljazeera, relegated after losing 4-1 to Wefaq Sabratha on June 18, 2009
 Aman al Aam, relegated after Al Hilal's 0-0 draw with Sweahly on June 24, 2009

Teams promoted from 2008–09 Libyan Third Division
 Reaf
 Amal Tarhouna = al amal S.C.
 Shati
 Shabab Al Jabal
 Qurthabia
 Al Hurriya
 Nusoor Mertouba

Promotion Stage

Group Winners 
 Group A - Aljazeera
 Group B - Al Wahda (Tripoli)
 Group C - Harati
 Group D - Benghazi al Jadeeda
 Group E - Darnes

Table

Results

References

 
Libyan Second Division
2009–10 in Libyan football